Fitchburg Longsjo Classic, also known as the Longsjo Classic, was an annual bicycle race held in Fitchburg, Massachusetts, United States. The race began in 1960 as the Arthur M. Longsjo Jr Memorial Race, in honor of Art Longsjo.

History 
The race was founded in Fitchburg, Massachusetts in 1960, as the Arthur M. Longsjo Jr. Memorial Bicycle Race., in memory of Fitchburg native and resident Art Longsjo. In 1956 Longsjo competed in the Winter Olympics as a speed skater and at the Summer Olympics as a cyclist, making him the first American to compete in Summer and Winter Olympic Games in one year. In 1958, Longsjo Perished in a car crash in Vermont, while driving home after winning the 180-mile long Quebec-Montreal Road Race. In 1960, local civic and business leaders in the city and Art Longsjo's widow Terry Longsjo organized the first race, with input from Longsjo's racing friend Guy Morin. In 1980, a new race organizing committee formed, which renamed the event the Fitchburg Longsjo Classic. The race was one of the leading bicycle competitions in the United States during this time, as evidenced by the well-known riders on the winners' list. 

In 1991, the race expanded to a four-day stage race format, which continued through 2010. Stages included a time trial, a circuit race on a 3-mile loop in the Fitchburg State University area, a road race in Princeton and Westminster that finished atop Mount Wachusett, and the traditional downtown Fitchburg criterium. As a stage race, the event was one of the largest pro-am bicycle stage races in the country and part of the various national calendar races of the period.

In 2011, the race was planned to be changed from a four-day event to one day, due to financial and organizational difficulties, but was cancelled due to a building fire on the downtown racecourse. The fire occurred on June 13 at the Johnsonia Building; the race was not able to occur due to many of the streets that were in the race's pathway being closed. A 2012 multi-stage event was planned; however, the race was cancelled on June 11. 

In 2013, the race was revived by the newly-created Art Longsjo Foundation as a two-day event, with a criterium in downtown Leominster in addition to the traditional Fitchburg race. A criterium in downtown Worcester was added to the event from 2014 through 2016. 2017 and 2018 included downtown races in Leominster and Fitchburg. In 2019, only the downtown Fitchburg race was held. On March 18, 2020, the Art Longsjo Foundation announced the end of the event, citing the difficulty of procuring sponsorship money from local businesses, as well as the sharp decline in riders entries over the last 5–10 years, as seen throughout the US.

Past winners 

The following gives Fitchburg Criterium winners for 1960–1990, stage race winners for 1991–2010, and day winners for 2013–2019.

Women 

 1977 – Connie Carpenter Boulder, CO
 1978 – Sue Novara-Reber Flint, MI
 1979 – Mary Jane Reoch Philadelphia, PA
 1980 – Beth Heiden Madison, WI
 1981 – Carol Varnier Montreal, Canada
 1982 – Pam Deem Pomona, CA
 1983 – Betsy Davis Elizabeth, NJ
 1984 – Liz Larsen Exeter, NH 
 1985 – Jeanne Golay Gainesville, FL
 1986 – Barbara Gradley Westwood, NJ
 1987 – Beth Mills Plymouth, MA
 1988 – Jessica Grieco Emerson, NJ
 1989 – Lucy Tyler Largo, NJ
 1990 – Susan Elias Readfield, ME
 1991 – Stephanie Roussos Amherst, MA
 1992 – Karen Mackin Troy, NY
 1993 – Rebecca Twigg Flagstaff, AZ
 1994 – Jacqui Nelson Wellington, New Zealand
 1995 – Kathy Watt Australia
 1996 – Lynn Nixon Australia
 1997 – Giana Roberge Saratoga Springs, NY
 1998 – Dede (Demet) Barry Boulder, CO
 1999 – Lyne Bessette Quebec, Canada
 2000 – Lyne Bessette (2) Quebec, Canada
 2001 – Lyne Bessette (3) Quebec, Canada
 2002 – Lyne Bessette (4) Quebec, Canada
 2003 – Katie Mactier 
 2004 – Sue Palmer-Komar Ontario, CAN
 2005 – Sue Palmer-Komar (2) Ontario CAN
 2006 – Sarah Ulmer 
 2007 – Genevieve Gauthier Montreal, CAN
 2008 – Catherine Cheatley 
 2009 – Evelyn Stevens 
 2010 – Catherine Cheatley 
 2013 – Amy Miner (Leominster) 
 2013 – Ellen Noble (Fitchburg) 
 2013 – Amy Miner (Omnium) 
 2014 – Amy Cutler (Leominster) 
 2014 – Amy Cutler (Worcester) 
 2014 – Amy Cutler (Fitchburg)   
 2014 – Amy Cutler (Omnium) 
 2015 – Laura Summers (Leominster) 
 2015 – Emily Underwood (Worcester) 
 2015 – Emily Underwood (Fitchburg)   
 2015 – Leslie Timm (Omnium) 
 2016 – Ellen Noble (Leominster)   
 2016 – Ellen Noble (Worcester)   
 2016 – Amy Cutler (Fitchburg)   
 2016 – Ellen Noble (Omnium)   
 2017 – Regina Legge (Leominster)  
 2017 – Colleen Gulick (Fitchburg) 
 2018 – Ellen Noble (Leominster) 
 2018 – Ellen Noble (Fitchburg) 
 2019 – Emma White (Fitchburg)

Men 

 1960 – Guy Morin 
 1961 – Arnie Uhrlass 
 1962 – Richard Centore 
 1963 – Rob Parsons 
 1964 – Paul Ziak 
 1965 – Franco Poutenzieri 
 1966 – Sam Watson 
 1967 – Guiseppi Marinoni 
 1968 – Robert Simpson 
 1969 – Jocelyn Lovell 
 1970 – Doug Dale 
 1971 – Bobby Phillips 
 1972 – Giuseppi Marinoni (2) 
 1973 – Steve Woznick 
 1974 – Bill Shook 
 1975 – Wayne Stetina 
 1976 – Tom Doughty 
 1977 – Wayne Stetina (2) 
 1978 – Wayne Stetina (3) 
 1979 – Tom Schuler 
 1980 – Bruce Donaghy 
 1981 – Steve Pyle 
 1982 – Alan McCormack 
 1983 – Louis Garneau 
 1984 – Russ Williams 
 1985 – Jeff Slack 
 1986 – Patrick Liu 
 1987 – Roberto Gaggioli 
 1988 – Graeme Miller 
 1989 – Jeff Slack (2) 
 1990 – Tom Post 
 1991 – Davis Phinney 
 1992 – Lance Armstrong 
 1993 – Davis Phinney (2) 
 1994 – Frank McCormack 
 1995 – Mike Engleman 
 1996 – Tyler Hamilton 
 1997 – John Peters 
 1998 – Frank McCormack (2) 
 1999 – Bart Bowen 
 2000 – Henk Vogels 
 2001 – Eric Wohlberg 
 2002 – Chris Horner 
 2003 – Viktor Rapinski 
 2004 – Mark McCormack 
 2005 – Jonathan Page 
 2006 – Shawn Milne 
 2007 – Jake Rytlewski 
 2008 – Kyle Wamsley 
 2009 – Zachary Bell 
 2010 – David Veilleux 
 2013 – Allan Rego (Leominster) 
 2013 – Peter Goguen (Fitchburg) 
 2013 – Bobby Bailey (Omnium) 
 2014 – Cole Archambault (Leominster) 
 2014 – Isaac Howe (Worcester) 
 2014 – Isaac Howe (Fitchburg) 
 2014 – Cole Archambault (Omnium) 
 2015 – Sam Rosenholtz (Leominster) 
 2015 – Marloe Rodman (Worcester) 
 2015 – Kai Wiggins (Fitchburg) 
 2015 – Kai Wiggins (Omnium) 
 2016 – Curtis White (Leominster) 
 2016 – Bobby Bailey (Worcester) 
 2016 – Charles Huff (Fitchburg) 
 2016 – Curtis White (Omnium) 
 2017 – J. C. Brookshire (Leominster) 
 2017 – Joshua Anderson (Fitchburg) 
 2018 – Ryan Dewald (Leominster) 
 2018 – Curtis White (Fitchburg) 
 2019 – Curtis White (Fitchburg)

References

1960 establishments in Massachusetts
2020 disestablishments in Massachusetts
Cycle races in the United States
Cycling in Massachusetts
Sports in Fitchburg, Massachusetts
Leominster, Massachusetts
Men's road bicycle races
Princeton, Massachusetts
Recurring sporting events established in 1960
Recurring sporting events disestablished in 2020
Sports in Worcester, Massachusetts
Sports in Worcester County, Massachusetts
Tourist attractions in Worcester, Massachusetts
Tourist attractions in Worcester County, Massachusetts
Westminster, Massachusetts
Women's road bicycle races